Eskeland is a Norwegian surname. Notable people with the surname include:

Ivar Eskeland (1927–2005), Norwegian philologist, publisher, translator, biographer, literary critic, newspaper editor, theatre worker, radio personality and organizational leader
Lars Eskeland (1867–1942), Norwegian educator and writer
Liv Kari Eskeland (born 1965), Norwegian politician
Roger Eskeland (born 1977), Norwegian footballer
Severin Eskeland (1880–1964), Norwegian educator, biographer and politician
Ståle Eskeland (1943–2015), Norwegian jurist

Norwegian-language surnames